Jonathan Rayshad Davis (born May 12, 1992) is an American professional baseball outfielder in the Detroit Tigers organization. He has previously played in Major League Baseball (MLB) for the Toronto Blue Jays, New York Yankees, and Milwaukee Brewers.

High school and college
Davis attended Camden Fairview High School in Camden, Arkansas. As a senior, he recorded a .419 batting average with three home runs and 19 stolen bases. Undrafted out of high school, he then attended the University of Central Arkansas, and played baseball for the Central Arkansas Bears for three seasons. In his freshman season, Davis batted .350 with five home runs, 30 runs batted in (RBI), and 21 stolen bases. As a sophomore, he hit .333 with 29 RBI and 17 stolen bases. In his third and final season with the Bears, Davis hit .268 with three home runs, 49 RBI, and 25 stolen bases.

Professional career

Toronto Blue Jays
The Toronto Blue Jays selected Davis in the 15th round of the 2013 Major League Baseball draft. He was assigned to the Rookie Advanced Bluefield Blue Jays for the remainder of the year, and hit .238 with two home runs and 14 RBI in 43 games. Injuries limited Davis to 28 games in 2014, mostly with the Short Season-A Vancouver Canadians. He began the 2015 season with the Class-A Lansing Lugnuts, and was promoted to the Advanced-A Dunedin Blue Jays after hitting .408 in 13 games. With Dunedin, Davis appeared in 47 games and hit .230 with one home run and 14 RBI. Davis would then spend the entire 2016 campaign with Dunedin, hitting .252 and establishing career-highs in home runs (14), RBI (54), and stolen bases (33). During the offseason, Davis played in 14 games for the Indios de Mayagüez of the Puerto Rican Winter League.

Davis played the entire 2017 season with the Double-A New Hampshire Fisher Cats, hitting .249 with 10 home runs, 45 RBI, and 20 stolen bases in 128 games. Playing in the offseason for the second consecutive season, he appeared in 21 games for the Peoria Javelinas of the Arizona Fall League (AFL), and helped the team win the AFL championship. Davis opened the 2018 season with New Hampshire. On June 26, he recorded the first cycle in Fisher Cats franchise history. Davis hit .302 with five home runs, 33 RBI, and 19 stolen bases in 78 games with New Hampshire before he was promoted to the Triple-A Buffalo Bisons in July.

On September 4, Davis was called up by the Blue Jays. He hit his first base hit on September 12 against the Red Sox.

Davis started the 2019 season in Buffalo, but was called up on May 10. Davis hit his first major league home run on May 27 against Hunter Wood in an 8–3 loss to the Tampa Bay Rays. He ended the season hitting .181 in 37 games.

Davis made a fantastic leaping catch to rob a home run in the last game of the 2020 regular season, and it was considered to be a potential "catch of the year". Overall with the 2020 Blue Jays, Davis batted .259 with 1 home run and 6 RBIs in 13 games.

On July 30, 2021, Davis was designated for assignment by the Blue Jays following the acquisition of Joakim Soria.

New York Yankees
On August 3, 2021, Davis was claimed off of waivers by the New York Yankees. On August 10, 2021 Davis scored his first Yankees run. On September 9, 2021 the Yankees designated Davis for assignment. He was outrighted to the Triple-A Scranton/Wilkes-Barre RailRiders two days later. Davis became a free agent following the season.

Milwaukee Brewers
On November 18, 2021, Davis signed a minor league deal with the Milwaukee Brewers with an invitation to spring training. On June 18, 2022, Davis had his contract selected from Triple-A Nashville.

Detroit Tigers
On January 30, 2023, Davis signed a minor league contract with the Detroit Tigers organization.

References

External links

1992 births
African-American baseball players
American expatriate baseball players in Canada
Baseball players from Arkansas
Bluefield Blue Jays players
Buffalo Bisons (minor league) players
Central Arkansas Bears baseball players
Dunedin Blue Jays players
Gulf Coast Blue Jays players
Indios de Mayagüez players
Lansing Lugnuts players
Living people
Major League Baseball outfielders
Milwaukee Brewers players
New Hampshire Fisher Cats players
New York Yankees players
People from Camden, Arkansas
Peoria Javelinas players
Toronto Blue Jays players
Vancouver Canadians players
21st-century African-American sportspeople
Scranton/Wilkes-Barre RailRiders players
Nashville Sounds players
Wisconsin Timber Rattlers players